The English Council of State, later also known as the Protector's Privy Council, was first appointed by the Rump Parliament on 14 February 1649 after the execution of King Charles I.

Charles' execution on 30 January was delayed for several hours  so that the House of Commons could pass an emergency bill to declare the representatives of the people, the House of Commons, as the source of all just power and to make it an offence to proclaim a new King. This in effect abolished the monarchy and the House of Lords.

History
The Council of State was appointed by Parliament on 14 and 15 February 1649, with further annual elections. The Council's duties were to act as the executive of the country's government in place of the King and the Privy Council. It was to direct domestic and foreign policy and to ensure the security of the English Commonwealth. Due to the disagreements between the New Model Army and the weakened Parliament,  it was dominated by the Army.

The Council held its first meeting on 17 February 1649 "with [Oliver] Cromwell in the chair". This meeting was quite rudimentary, "some 14 members" attending, barely more than the legal quorum of nine out of forty-one councillors elected by Parliament. The first elected president of the council, appointed on 12 March, was John Bradshaw who had been the President of the Court at the trial of Charles I and the first to sign the King's death warrant.

The members of the first council were the Earls of Denbigh, Mulgrave, Pembroke, and Salisbury; Lords Grey and Fairfax; Lisle, Rolle, Oliver St John, Wilde, Bradshaw, Cromwell, Skippon, Pickering, Masham, Haselrig, Harington, Vane jun, Danvers, Armine, Mildmay, Constable, Pennington, Wilson, Whitelocke, Martin, Ludlow, Stapleton, Heveningham, Wallop, Hutchinson, Bond, Popham, Valentine Walton, Scot, Purefoy, Jones.

When the Rump Parliament was dissolved by Cromwell with the support of the Army Council on 20 April 1653, the Council went into abeyance. It was reconstituted on 29 April with thirteen members seven of whom were Army officers. With the failure of Barebone's Parliament, the Council was re-modelled with the Instrument of Government to become something much closer to the old Privy Council advising the Lord Protector Oliver Cromwell. Constitutionally between thirteen and twenty-one councillors were elected by Parliament to advise the Protector, who was also elected by Parliament. In reality Cromwell relied on the Army for support and chose his own councillors.

The replacement constitution of 1657, the pseudo-monarchical Humble Petition and Advice, authorised 'His Highness the Lord Protector'; to choose twenty-one Councillors and the power to nominate his successor. Cromwell recommended his eldest surviving son Richard Cromwell, who was proclaimed the successor on his father's death on 3 September 1658 and legally confirmed in the position by the newly elected Third Protectorate Parliament on 27 January 1659.

After the reinstatement of the Rump Parliament (7 May 1659) and the subsequent abolition of the position of Lord Protector, the role of the Council of State along with other interregnum institutions becomes confused as the instruments of state started to implode. The Council of State was not dissolved until 28 May 1660, when King Charles II personally assumed the government in London.

Lord President of the Council of State
The role of the President of the Council of State (usually addressed as "Lord President") was intended to simply preside over the Council of State.

John Bradshaw, the first president, served in the office longer than any other person to do so (serving for two years and ten months total). The reason no other individual served in the position longer than Bradshaw was due to a resolution passed by the Parliament on 26 November 1651 stating that "That no Person of any Committee of Parliament, or of the Council of State, shall be in the Chair of that Committee, or Council, for any longer Time, at once, than one Month" (Commons Journal, 7:43–44). Even during the Protectorate of Oliver and Richard Cromwell, the position of Lord President of the Council of State, known during this period as the Protector's Privy Council, remained in existence until the re-establishment of the monarchy in 1660.

The following is a list of those who served as the Lord President of the Council of State.

Notes

References

Further reading
 
 

1649 establishments in England
1653 disestablishments
1659 establishments in England
1660 disestablishments
Republicanism in England
Stuart England
English Civil War
Government of England
Interregnum (England)
1660s disestablishments in England